Nigel Alexander Dawes (born February 9, 1985) is a Canadian-Kazakhstani professional ice-hockey winger for Adler Mannheim of the Deutsche Eishockey Liga (DEL). He played 212 games in 5 seasons in the National Hockey League (NHL) for the New York Rangers, Phoenix Coyotes, Calgary Flames, Atlanta Thrashers, and Montreal Canadiens.

Since leaving the NHL, Dawes has become known as a Sniper (goalscorer) in Europe particularly in the Kontinental Hockey League (KHL) with Barys Astana, Avtomobilist Yekaterinburg and Ak Bars Kazan scoring 267 goals and 505 points in 543 games in the KHL - making him 5th all-time in KHL point scoring and 2nd in goals.

In major junior Dawes played for the Kootenay Ice in the Western Hockey League, with Kootenay he was part of the team that won the 2002 Memorial Cup. He was also part of Team Canada's IIHF World Junior Championship teams of 2004 and 2005, winning Gold at the latter.He later switched to Kazakhstan.

Playing career
Dawes played junior ice hockey for the Kootenay Ice in the Western Hockey League. In his first year, the Ice won the 2002 Memorial Cup after winning the President's Cup as champions of the WHL. Dawes improved his play in his next two seasons in the WHL, and, for the 2003–04 season, he was named a first team All-Star in the Western Conference, the winner of the Brad Hornung Trophy (most sportsmanlike), and the Ice's most valuable player.

Dawes was drafted in the fifth round, 149th overall, in the 2003 NHL Entry Draft by the New York Rangers, after two seasons in the WHL. After three seasons of junior hockey and four games in the American Hockey League for the Hartford Wolf Pack at the end of the 2003–04 season, the Rangers signed Dawes to his first professional contract on September 1, 2004, when he was 19 years old. Dawes went on to play another season with the Ice, recognized for his talent as a finalist for the Four Broncos Memorial Trophy (WHL player of the year), before breaking into the professional game in the AHL. Dawes finished his Kootenay Ice career as the franchise leader in goals, with 159 scored in 245 games.

Dawes scored his first NHL goal against Andrew Raycroft on October 21, 2006, in the Rangers 5–4 win over the Toronto Maple Leafs. After playing in seven games then being a healthy scratch for seven of the next eight, Dawes was sent down to play with the Wolf Pack for the rest of the 2006–07 season. He returned to play in the Rangers' final game of the playoffs on May 6, 2007. Game six against the Buffalo Sabres in the Eastern Conference Semifinals was Dawes's first NHL playoff game. While Dawes was trying to block a shot, the first Sabres goal deflected off of his body to go into the net past goalie Henrik Lundqvist. The Rangers lost the game 5–4 to lose the series 4–2.

Dawes recorded his first NHL assist in the 2007–08 season. Dawes had become a good shootout option for the Rangers, scoring four times on seven attempts at that point. During regular play, played as high as the second line at points during the 2007–08 season.

On July 16, 2008, Dawes re-signed with the Rangers to a one-year, $587,500 contract. On March 4, 2009, Dawes was traded to the Phoenix Coyotes along with Dmitri Kalinin and Petr Průcha for Derek Morris. On July 16, 2009, Dawes was claimed off waivers by the Calgary Flames.

On September 8, 2010, Dawes signed a one-year, two-way contract with the Atlanta Thrashers worth $600,000 in the NHL and $105,000 in the American Hockey League (AHL). He was traded on February 24, 2011, to the Montreal Canadiens, along with Brent Sopel for Ben Maxwell and a 4th-round pick in the 2011 NHL Entry Draft.

On May 31, 2011, Dawes left the NHL and signed a one-year contract with Kazakhstan-based Barys Astana of the Kontinental Hockey League (KHL). He continued the relationship through the 2017–18 season.

On July 14, 2020, Dawes as a free agent and the fifth leading scorer in KHL history extended his tenure in Russia, signing a one-year contract with Ak Bars Kazan.

On June 11, 2021, Dawes signed a two-year contract with Adler Mannheim of the Deutsche Eishockey Liga (DEL).

International play

Dawes played for Canada in the 2004 and 2005 World Junior Ice Hockey Championships, winning silver and gold medals, respectively. In 2004, Dawes led all players with six goals to go along with five assists in six games, tying for first with 11 points. Two goals and one assist came in the gold medal game against the United States, after which Dawes was named as Canada's player of the game. He registered two goals and four assists in six games in 2005.

On March 24, 2016, the IIHF announced it had approved a request to allow Dawes, Brandon Bochenski, and Dustin Boyd to play for Kazakhstan at the 2016 IIHF World Championship. All three players received Kazakhstani citizenship via naturalization, making them eligible.

Personal life
Dawes was born in Winnipeg to a Canadian mother and Jamaican father.

Career statistics

Regular season and playoffs

International

Awards and honours

See also
 List of black ice hockey players

References

External links
 

1985 births
Living people
Adler Mannheim players
Ak Bars Kazan players
Atlanta Thrashers players
Avtomobilist Yekaterinburg players
Barys Nur-Sultan players
Black Canadian ice hockey players
Calgary Flames players
Canadian ice hockey left wingers
Canadian people of Jamaican descent
Chicago Wolves players
Hamilton Bulldogs (AHL) players
Hartford Wolf Pack players
Kazakhstani ice hockey players
Kootenay Ice players
Montreal Canadiens players
New York Rangers draft picks
New York Rangers players
Phoenix Coyotes players
Ice hockey people from Winnipeg
People from St. Vital, Winnipeg